Pangako sa 'Yo (International title: The Promise / ) is a 2015 Philippine drama television series based on 2000 prime time series of the same name. It is topbilled by Kathryn Bernardo, Daniel Padilla, Jodi Sta. Maria, Angelica Panganiban, and Ian Veneracion. The series aired on ABS-CBN's "Primetime Bida" evening block and worldwide on The Filipino Channel from May 25, 2015 to February 12, 2016, replacing Forevermore. It was subsequently replaced by Dolce Amore.

Series overview 
 
  
The story revolves around lovers Yna Macaspac and Angelo Buenavista. Unbeknownst to them, their love story started 20 years earlier between Amor de Jesús and Eduardo Buenavista. Unfortunately, Amor and Eduardo's love will be destroyed because of greed, ambition, and lies. Amor returns to the Philippines as Amor Powers and vows revenge on the Buenavista family which will hurt her biological daughter, Yna, in the process. Meanwhile, Madam Claudia, Angelo's mother, will do anything to destroy Yna and Angelo's relationship and make Yna's life a nightmare.

Cast and characters

Main cast
 Kathryn Bernardo as María Amor de Jesús / Yna Macaspac 
 Daniel Padilla as Angelo S. Buenavista 
 Jodi Sta. Maria as Amor de Jesús / Amor Powers
 Ian Veneracion as Eduardo Buenavista
 Angelica Panganiban as Claudia T. Salameda-Buenavista / Greta Barcial

Supporting cast
Book 1
 
 Amy Austria-Ventura as Belén Macaspac
 Ronnie Lazaro as Francisco "Iskô" Macaspac
 Andrea Brillantes as Lía S. Buenavista
 Grae Fernández as Jonathan "Egoy" Mobido
 Juan Karlos Labajo as Vincent "Amboy" Mobido
 Diego Loyzaga as David San Luis / David Powers 
 Dominic Roque as Mark Delgado
 Alex Díaz as Miguel Ramírez
 Carla Martinez as Leonora Villamejía-Salameda
 Bernard Palanca as Anton Diego Buenavista
 Joem Bascon as Caloy Macaspac
 Jan Marini Pizarras as Lourdes Magbanua / Lourdes Abad 
 Sunshine Garcia as Julieta Macaspac
 Niña Dolino as Roma Christie
 Alex Medina as Simón Barcial
 Erika Padilla as Betty Mae Verseles
 Thou Reyes as Takong
 Pamu Pamorada as Kim
 Angelou Alayon as Red Macaspac
 DJ Jhai Ho as Coring
 Arlene Muhlach as Chef Jen
 Lou Veloso as Sous Chef Tony
 Lollie Mara as Yaya Pacita
 Viveika Ravanes as Alta
 BJ Forbes as Adam
 Daniel Ombao as Lloyd
 Jeffrey Tam as Mang Gabby
 Manuel "Ku" Aquino as Antonio Macaspac
 Richard Quan as Gov. Theodore "Teddy" Boborol
 Sarah Carlos as Bea Bianca Bejerrano
 Rubi Rubi as Irma Marandanan
 Kyline Alcantara as Jessa Boborol

Book 2
 
 Tirso Cruz III as Gregorio "Lolo Greggy" Noble
 Sue Ramírez as Joy "Ligaya" Miranda
 Bayani Agbayani as Bronson "Kabayan"
 Mickey Ferriols as Monay
 Kristel Fulgar as Ichu Miranda
 Clarence Delgado as Bubwit
 Patrick Sugui as Lloyd García
 Angel Sy as Sophía
 Ayla Mendero as Patty
 Samantha Colet as Zoe
 Kristine Sablan as Daphne
 Christian Lloyd García as Christian

Special participation
Book 1
 
 JB Agustin as young Angelo
 Pilar Pilapil as Doña Benita Buenavista
 Sylvia Sanchez as Krystal Toleda
 Boboy Garovillo as Pepe de Jesús
 Sharmaine Suarez as Chayong de Jesús
 Leo Rialp as Gov. Enrique Salameda
 Jong Cuenco as Mr. Castro
 Anne Feo as Sous Chef Linda
 Mimi Orara as Chef Gina
 Jess Mendoza as Lester de Jesús
 Kimberly Fulgar as Neneth de Jesús
 Khalil Ramos as Jasper Bejerrano
 Sandy Andolong as Myrna Santos-de Jesús
 Bubbles Paraiso as Natalie
 Manny Castañeda as Mang Candy
 Minco Fabregas as Parish Priest
 Odette Khan as Gloria Bejerrano
 Pinky Marquez as Puring Bejerrano
 Cherry Lou as Chef Sheila 

Book 2
 
 Dante Ponce as Christian Cristóbal
 Franco Daza as Andrew García
 Emmanuelle Vera as Chelsea
 Helga Krapf as Marga
 Young JV as Tony
 Toby Alejar as Siegfried García
 Maria Isabel Lopez as Isabel Miranda
 Tom Olivar as Barangay Captain
 Daisy Reyes as Atty. Hazel Santiago
 Matet de Leon as Chef Sam
 Jerome Ponce as Charles García

Soundtrack
 Pangako – Vina Morales
 Panaginip – Juris
 Nag-Iisa Lang – Juris (also used as Angeline Quinto's cover version from Inday Bote.)

Gallery

Reception

Notes

1.  recorded 39.9% in 2015 and 33.5% in 2016

The strict schedule followed during Duterte's proclamation rally factored in the time slot of Pangako Sa 'Yo. An insider in the Duterte campaign team said the real worry was that Tondo residents would disperse if the duration of the proclamation rally got dangerously close to the time slot of the show. Pangako Sa ‘Yo topped Google's most searched TV shows in 2015. Amor and Claudia have become a collection line under a high-end fashion brand.

Critical reception
Katrina Stuart Santiago of The Manila Times praised the writers and added, "Suffice it to say that one cannot wait for what else will happen in this Pangako Sa ‘Yo, and that says a lot for someone who actually followed the original version in 2000."

Awards and nominations
{| class="wikitable" style="text-align:center"
!Year
!Award Giving Body
!Category
!Recipient(s)
!Result
!Ref.
|-
| rowspan="12"|2015
| 1st GIC Innovation Awards for Television
| Most Innovative Actress
| Jodi Sta. Maria
| 
|
|-
| rowspan="5"|29th PMPC Star Awards for Television
| Best Drama Actor
| Daniel Padilla
| 
| rowspan="5"|
|-
| rowspan="2"|Best Drama Actress
| Angelica Panganiban
| 
|-
| Jodi Sta. Maria
| 
|-
| Best Supporting Actor
| Ronnie Lazaro
| 
|-
| Best Supporting Actress
| Amy Austria-Ventura
| 
|-
| rowspan="4"|1st RAWR Awards
| TV Show of the Year
| Pangako Sa 'Yo
| 
| rowspan="4"|
|-
| Character of the Year (as Amor Powers)
| Jodi Sta. Maria
| 
|-
| Character of the Year (as Claudia Buenavista)
| Angelica Panganiban
| 
|-
| QOTY (Quote of the Year)"Matitikman ninyo ang batas ng isang api!" – Amor Powers
| Jodi Sta. Maria
| 
|-
| rowspan="2"|6th TV Series Craze Awards|| TV Series Craze Award for Leading Lady of the Year ||  Jodi Sta. Maria || 
|
|-
|| TV Series Craze Award for Leading Man of the Year||  Ian Veneracion || 
|
|-
| rowspan="4"|2016
|  2016 Gawad Tanglaw Awards || Best Performance by an Actress (TV Series) || Jodi Sta. Maria ||  ||<ref>"2016 Anak TV Awards Winners". Gawad Tanglaw Award Winners'. Retrieved 2016-02-18.</ref> 
|-
| 2016 International Emmy Awards || International Emmy Award for Best Actress || Jodi Sta. Maria ||  ||
|-
|PUSH Award ||Popular TV Performance ||Jodi Sta. Maria and Angelica Panganiban ||||
|-
| 2nd RAWR Awards || TV Show of the Year || Pangako Sa 'Yo ||  ||
|}

 Original and Remake Differences  

 Trivia 
Jodi Sta. Maria who previously played Lia Buenavista, now played as the iconic Amor Powers. Amy Austria who previously played as Lourdes Mangpantay, now played as Belen Macaspac. Richard Quan who previously played as Benjie Gatmaitan, now played as Gov. Theodore 'Ted' Boborol. They were the only actors who returned in the remake.

Adaptation
An upcoming Mexican adaptation of the series is in the works.

International broadcast
 The series was aired in Indonesia on MNCTV (titled Janjiku and dubbed in Indonesian), one of the main commercial TV networks of the country from November 21, 2016 until January 13, 2017. Due to its popularity, the series was reaired by MNCTV from January 12, 2017.
 The series was also aired in Malaysia (dubbed into Malay language) on Astro Prima and Astro Maya HD, started from January 2017 until May 2017.
 The Peruvian network Panamericana Televisión announced it would air and dub the series in Spanish under the name of La Promesa and is the second Filipino drama production to be broadcast in Latin America after Puentes de Amor (Bridges of Love''). The show premiered on Thursday, September 22, 2016, by Panamericana Televisión de Perú, from Monday to Friday at 5:30 p.m. and ended on March 3, 2017.

See also 

 Pangako Sa 'Yo (original version)
 List of programs broadcast by ABS-CBN
 List of telenovelas of ABS-CBN

References

External links
 
 

Pangako Sa 'Yo
ABS-CBN drama series
Philippine melodrama television series
Philippine romance television series
2015 Philippine television series debuts
2016 Philippine television series endings
Television series by Star Creatives
Television series reboots
Filipino-language television shows
Television shows set in the Philippines